The 2020–21 Kansas State Wildcats men's basketball team represented Kansas State University in the 2020–21 NCAA Division I men's basketball season, their 118th basketball season. Their head coach is Bruce Weber in his ninth year at the helm of the Wildcats. The team played their home games in Bramlage Coliseum in Manhattan, Kansas as members of the Big 12 Conference. They finished the season 9-20, 4-14 in Big 12 Play to finish in 9th place. They defeated TCU in the first round of the Big 12 tournament before losing in the quarterfinals to Baylor.

Roster

Schedule and results

|-
!colspan=12 style=|Regular Season

|-
!colspan=12 style=| Big 12 tournament

Rankings

*AP does not release post-NCAA tournament rankings^Neither poll released a Week 1 ranking list.

References

Kansas State Wildcats men's basketball seasons
Kansas State
2020 in sports in Kansas
Kansas